Sertan Eser (born April 18, 1974 in Germany) is a Turkish retired footballer who played as a left forward and striker.

He has played 9 times for the Turkey under-21 team. 

He has previously played for Antalya Köy Hizmetleri, Konyaspor, Beşiktaş J.K., Adanaspor, Yimpaş Yozgatspor, Sakaryaspor, Malatyaspor, Ankaraspor, Bursaspor, Diyarbakırspor, Gençlerbirliği, Malatyaspor (again) and İstanbul Büyükşehir Belediyespor.

References

External links
Profile at TFF.org

1974 births
Living people
Turkish footballers
Turkey under-21 international footballers
Konyaspor footballers
Beşiktaş J.K. footballers
Malatyaspor footballers
Ankaraspor footballers
Bursaspor footballers
Diyarbakırspor footballers
Gençlerbirliği S.K. footballers
İstanbul Başakşehir F.K. players
Kasımpaşa S.K. footballers
Süper Lig players
German people of Turkish descent
Association football forwards